Styrax americanus, the American snowbell or mock-orange, is a plant species native to the southeastern United States and the Ohio Valley. It has been reported from Texas and Florida to Virginia and Missouri. It generally grows in swamps and on floodplains and in other wet locations.

Styrax americanus is a shrub or small tree up to 5 m (17 feet) tall. Leaves are elliptic to ovate, up to 10 cm (4 inches) long. Flowers are borne in the axils of some of the leaves.

Two varieties of this species exist:
 Styrax americanus var. americanus (American snowbell) common to swamp forests and wet habitats ranging from West Virginia south to Florida and west to Texas and Missouri.
 Styrax americanus var. pulverulentus (downy American snowbell) common to wet pine flatwoods ranging from South Carolina south to Florida and west to Texas and Missouri.

References

americanus
Flora of the United States